Oneida Township is a township in Delaware County, Iowa, USA.  As of the 2020 census, its population was 1,403.

Geography
Oneida Township covers an area of 36.63 square miles (94.87 square kilometers). The streams of Almoral Branch and Garretts Branch run through this township.

Cities and towns
 Delaware (north three-quarters)
 Earlville

Unincorporated towns
 Almoral
 Almoral Siding (historical)
 Oneida
(This list is based on USGS data and may include former settlements.)

Adjacent townships
 Elk Township (north)
 Colony Township (northeast)
 Bremen Township (east)
 Delhi Township (south)
 Milo Township (southwest)
 Delaware Township (west)
 Honey Creek Township (northwest)

Cemeteries
The township contains three cemeteries: Fairview, Pine View and Saint Josephs.

Major highways
 U.S. Route 20

References

External links
 US-Counties.com
 City-Data.com
U.S. Board on Geographic Names (GNIS)
United States Census Bureau cartographic boundary files

Townships in Delaware County, Iowa
Townships in Iowa